Adrián Miguel Scifo (born 10 October 1987) is an Argentine footballer.

References

 
 
 

1987 births
Living people
Argentine footballers
Argentine expatriate footballers
Association football defenders
Nueva Chicago footballers
Quilmes Atlético Club footballers
Unión Española footballers
Club Atlético Sarmiento footballers
Club Atlético Temperley footballers
Club y Biblioteca Ramón Santamarina footballers
Club Atlético Fénix players
Club Atlético Villa San Carlos footballers
Chilean Primera División players
Argentine Primera División players
Argentine expatriate sportspeople in Chile
Expatriate footballers in Chile
People from Monte Caseros
Sportspeople from Corrientes Province